Karmir-Astkh is a rural locality (a khutor) in Kuzhorskoye Rural Settlement of Maykopsky District, in the Adygea Republic of Russia. The population was 26 as of 2018. There are 3 streets.

Geography 
Karmir-Astkh is located 22 km northeast of Tulsky (the district's administrative centre) by road. 17 let Oktyabrya is the nearest rural locality.

Ethnicity 
The khutor is inhabited by Russians.

References 

Rural localities in Maykopsky District